is a Japanese manga series written by Yuya Aoki and illustrated by Rando Ayamine. It was serialized in Kodansha's shōnen manga magazine Weekly Shōnen Magazine from March 1999 to February 2007, with its chapters collected in 39 tankōbon volumes. The plot follows the "GetBackers", a group that retrieves anything that was lost. The team is primarily composed of Ban Mido, a man born with the illusionary technique "Evil Eye", and Ginji Amano the former leader of a gang called "The Volts", a powerful group in the dangerous territory called the Infinity Fortress in Shinjuku.

A 49-episode anime television series adaptation animated by Studio Deen was broadcast on TBS from October 2002 to September 2003. The manga series was licensed for English release in North America by Tokyopop, which released 27 volumes between February 2004 and December 2008; their license expired in 2009.

Plot

The series tells the story of Ginji Amano and Ban Mido, a pair of super-powered individuals known as the "GetBackers". The duo operates a freelance repossession service out of one of the seedier areas of Shinjuku, Tokyo. For a fee, they will recover any lost or stolen item for a client with "an almost 100% success rate". The GetBackers' job often leads them into bizarre and dangerous situations in order to "get back what shouldn't be gone". Their targets range from lost video games to misplaced components of an atomic bomb. The plot mostly revolves around their adventures, often complicated by the pair's convoluted, individual pasts and a mysterious place known as the Infinity Fortress (Limitless Fortress in the anime dub).

A conglomeration of disused, condemned buildings clustered together to form a self-contained habitat, Limitless Fortress is subdivided into three specific tiers – Lower Town, the Beltline and Babylon City. Lower Town is the lowest in altitude, with several layers extending below ground level. The Beltline, the most dangerous area of The Limitless Fortress, is ruled by Der Kaiser, Ban's father. Babylon City, the upper most level of the Limitless Fortress, is said to be where the Brain Trust resides and is the home of Ginji's mother. In actuality, Babylon City is what one might consider the real world, with everything else being a virtual reality creation. Only those who have won the Ogre Battle may enter Babylon City and when that happens, they can change the world as they see fit. Both Ban and Ginji go to the Fortress with Ban wishing to rescue a kidnapped Himiko from Kagami, and Ginji finding a possibility to meet his mother. Going to the Beltline, the GetBackers encounter various warriors taking orders from a being known as Voodoo King from Babylon City. The Voodoo King seeks to obtain three "keys" which will help him unlock the gates from Babylon City sealed by Ban's grandmother several years ago. After finding the three keys: Shido's chimera spirit, Himiko's mirror and the GetBackers, the Voodoo King is faced by Ginji, Thunder Emperor alter-ego attacks him in a clash which destroys the Voodoo King and making Raitei disappear forever as he existed to balance the scales. With Voodoo King gone, Raitei's purpose was fulfilled and he disappeared forever. Following this, both Ban and Ginji face each other in Ogre Battle with Ban giving up, impressed with Ginji's will. Ginji goes to Babylon City where he meets his mother from a parallel universe, who explains how she created the Fortress and its surrounding world. Following a discussion between the two of them, the Fortress' world remains unchanged except that the virtual people living become real beings. Ban and Ginji continue their retrieval job, ending the series when requested to go on a mission that will lead them to meet Ban's mother.

The plot of the anime adaptation of GetBackers follows the manga's closely until the first season's ending. The second season features various stand alone episodes focused in the GetBackers' missions, while also two story arcs, the second ending the anime series with an open ending.

Development
Yuya Aoki conceived the idea of GetBackers two years before it started serialization. By that time he had few notes about it. Aoki remembers giving many troubles to his editor when he started writing it, but was glad he could finish it. The character of Ban Mido was originally meant to appear in another series from Aoki, but his editor liked it and wanted it to be one of the manga's protagonists. Ginji was meant to appear in the series, but his original personality was first meant to belong to Ban.

Media

Manga

GetBackers, written by Yuya Aoki and illustrated by Rando Ayamine, was serialized in Kodansha's shōnen manga Weekly Shōnen Magazine from March 23, 1999, to February 21, 2007. Kodansha collected its chapters in 39 tankōbon volumes, released from August 17, 1999, to April 17, 2007. An additional one-shot chapter was published in Magazine Special on February 20, 2009. 

GetBackers was licensed for an English language release in North America by Tokyopop, who first announced it in the Anime Expo 2004 in July 2003. Tokyopop divided the manga in two parts: GetBackers featuring the first twenty-five and GetBackers: Infinity Fortress the following ones. The volumes were published from February 10, 2004, to July 7, 2008; only the first two volumes of Infinity Fortress were released. On August 31, 2009, Tokyopop announced that the rights to the series had expired.

An artbook, titled G/B was released on March 15, 2005. A manga guidebook, titled GetBackers: The Last Piece, was released on April 17, 2007, containing information about the series' plot, characters, and popularity polls.

Anime

The anime adaptation of the GetBackers series was produced by Studio Deen and was directed by Kazuhiro Furuhashi and Keitaro Motonaga. The series premiered on Tokyo Broadcasting System in Japan on October 5, 2002 and ran for forty-nine episodes until September 20, 2003. The series was released to Region 2 DVD in Japan by TBS in seventeen individual volumes with three episodes per disc. The anime's music was composed by Taku Iwasaki, and two original soundtracks were released by Pioneer Corporation in Japan on January 24, 2003 and July 25, 2003.

The anime was first licensed in English by ADV Films. ADV released the English dubbed series in a total of ten DVD volumes from August 24, 2004 to November 1, 2005. Compilations volumes from the seasons 1 and 2 were also released on October 10, 2006 and January 2, 2007, while a full compilation of the series was published on January 15, 2008. In April 2009, A.D. Vision started streaming the series online in their The Anime Network website. The series has been re-licensed by Sentai Filmworks, who re-released it on DVD in later 2012. On August 25, 2016 the series began airing on ShortsHD.

The anime was also licensed by Sony Pictures Entertainment (SPE) which created its own English Dub in collaboration with Red Angel Media. The show broadcast on the Animax Channel in Asia, and ABS-CBN / Studio 23 in the Philippines.

Drama CDs
Two drama CDs have been released for the story arcs not found in the TV series, namely the news involving the GetBackers searching for disappeared kids involved with a card game named the Divine Design, their search for a red wine named the Marine Red, and the war between Shido Fuyuki's clan, the Maryudo and their rivals, the Kiryudo. The first CD, entitled 'GetBackers "TARGET G"', was released February 21, 2003. The second entitled 'GetBackers "TARGET B"' was released on March 21, 2003.

Video games
A total of five video games based on GetBackers have been released in Japan, all of them developed and published by Konami. The first was a fighting game GetBackers Dakkanoku: Ubawareta Mugenshiro for the PlayStation 2 and PC on September 26, 2002. GetBackers Dakkanoku - Jagan Fuuin! followed it in 2003 for the PC and Game Boy Advance, as well as the PC exclusive RPG GetBackers Dakkanoku: Metropolis Dakkan Sakusen!. Two more fighting games, GetBackers Dakkanoku: Dakkandayo! Zenin Shuugou! and GetBackers Dakkanoku - Urashinshiku Saikyou Battle, were released in 2003 and 2004, respectively. While the former was only for PCs, the latter was also released for the PlayStation 2. Rando Ayamine worked for all these video games, making illustrations for them.

The 2009 PlayStation Portable fighting game, Sunday vs Magazine: Shūketsu! Chōjō Daikessen, also produced by Konami, included Ban Mido as a playable character.

Reception
GetBackers manga has had over 18 million copies in circulation. English volumes from the manga have also been popular, appearing various times in Diamond Comic's rankings of best selling graphic novels. Anime News Network's Liann Cooper has commented on the manga, praising for using the "simple concept" in order to create an entertaining plot. The manga has been noted to have a large number of types of fan service, showing several kinds of beautiful women and noted a "relationship" between the two main characters and giving the series a nice bishōnen tone. The art of Rando Ayamine has been praised for having the dark and gritty mood emphasizes he makes in the series making readers think that the Jagan scene of Ban Mido is a "horrifying nightmare". The Tokyopop translation of the manga has been criticized for making the main characters sound like gangsters giving them strange dialogues. Cooper later noted that readers from Clamp's works or Rurouni Kenshin would find GetBackers appealing due to the several aspects it has. He still found issues with Tokyopop's translation, but still found the final product entertaining, also complimenting the series' comedy.

The anime adaptation of GetBackers was also well received. In the 26th annual Animage readers' poll, it took various categories: it was third in "Favorite Anime Series", ninth in "Favorite Episode" (episode 49) and fifth and eighth in "Favorite Male Character" (Ginji and Ban, respectively). It also received positive reviews ever since the first episode's premiere in Japan. For such an episode, Anime News Network liked the animations' quality as well as the main characters Ban and Ginji. The mix between drama and comedy was also well-received, hoping that it will continue like that for the remainder of the series. DVD Talk's John Sinnott called it a "solid show", enjoying the characters' growth as the series continued. However, he gave a low score on the DVDs' presentation mainly due to the lack of extras. While comparing it with the manga, Chris Beveridge from Mania Entertainment found the anime's introduction more appealing than the manga's but mentioned various issues already shown in the first episodes of various anime. Bamboo Dong from Anime News Network enjoyed how the story was built during the first season, finding appealing the fact that the characters he found appealing would take part in a larger story arc. Agreeing with Dong, Dani Moure from Mania liked the interaction between the characters, as well as a bigger exploration to some of them. Sinott concluded that the story arc involving the Limitless Fortress was "a good story" due to the expansion in the backgrounds from various of the main characters, but found it relatively longer than previous story arcs. Active Anime writer David C. Jones praised the focus on the anime's second season, liking how many secondary characters got their own episodes, as well as how the comedy was delivered across them, citing the episode focused on Ginji in the hospital as the best one from the season. On the other hand, Beveridge found that in the second season, characters were "overused", but like Jones, enjoyed the focus on other characters as well as the flashbacks exploring them. The anime's last story arc left mixed thoughts to Beveridge who found some of its events predictable or rushed, but still enjoyed the action sequences shown.

Notes

References

External links
 Official TBS GetBackers website 
 

GetBackers
1999 manga
2002 anime television series debuts
ADV Films
Action anime and manga
Anime series based on manga
Comedy anime and manga
Kodansha manga
Mainichi Broadcasting System original programming
Sentai Filmworks
Shōnen manga
Studio Deen
Supernatural anime and manga
TBS Television (Japan) original programming
Tokyopop titles